Annibale Silvano Venier (born 30 July 1951) is an Italian rower. He competed at the 1976 Summer Olympics and the 1988 Summer Olympics. His son, Simone Venier, is an Olympic silver medallist in rowing.

References

1951 births
Living people
Italian male rowers
Olympic rowers of Italy
Rowers at the 1976 Summer Olympics
Rowers at the 1988 Summer Olympics
Place of birth missing (living people)